Dame Lesley Lawson  (née Hornby; born 19 September 1949) is an English model, actress, and singer, widely known by the nickname Twiggy. She was a British cultural icon and a prominent teenaged model during the swinging '60s in London.

Twiggy was initially known for her thin build and the androgynous appearance considered to result from her big eyes, long eyelashes, and short hair. She was named "The Face of 1966" by the Daily Express and voted British Woman of the Year. By 1967, she had modelled in France, Japan, and the US, and had landed on the covers of Vogue and The Tatler. Her fame had spread worldwide.

After modelling, Twiggy enjoyed a successful career as a screen, stage, and television actress. Her role in The Boy Friend (1971) brought her two Golden Globe Awards. In 1983, she made her Broadway debut in the musical My One and Only, for which she earned a Tony nomination for Best Actress in a Musical. She later hosted her own series, Twiggy's People, in which she interviewed celebrities; she also appeared as a judge on the reality show America's Next Top Model. Her 1998 autobiography Twiggy in Black and White entered the best-seller lists. Since 2005, she has modelled for Marks and Spencer, most recently to promote their recent rebranding, appearing in television advertisements and print media, alongside Myleene Klass, Erin O'Connor, Lily Cole, and others. In 2012, she worked alongside Marks & Spencer's designers to launch an exclusive clothing collection for the M&S Woman range.

Early life
Lesley Hornby was born on 19 September 1949 and raised in Neasden (originally in Middlesex, now a suburb of north-west London). She was the third daughter of Nellie Lydia (née Reeman), a factory worker for a printing firm, and William Norman Hornby, a master carpenter and joiner from Lancashire. Their first daughter, Shirley, had been born 15 years earlier; their second, Vivien, had been born 7 years earlier. According to Twiggy, her maternal grandfather was Jewish. However, her mother's genealogy, which was examined on the series Who Do You Think You Are? in 2014, does not contain Jewish ancestry.

Twiggy's mother taught her to sew from an early age. She used this skill to make her own clothing. She attended the Brondesbury and Kilburn High School. Twiggy's great-great-grandmother, Grace Meadows, died in a stampede of excitable shoppers at a bargain sale at Messrs McIllroys store on Mare Street, in Hackney, in 1897. This event made the news at the time.

Modelling career (1965–1970)

1965–1967
Twiggy is best remembered as one of the first international supermodels and a fashion icon of the 1960s. Her greatest influence is Jean Shrimpton, whom Twiggy considers to be the world's first supermodel. She has said she based her "look" on Pattie Boyd. Twiggy herself has been described as the successor to Shrimpton.

In January 1966, aged 16, she had her hair coloured and cut short in London at Leonard of Mayfair, owned by celebrity hairdresser Leonard. The hair stylist was looking for models on whom to try out his new crop haircut and he styled her hair in preparation for a few test head shots. A professional photographer Barry Lategan took several photos for Leonard, which the hairdresser hung in his salon. Deirdre McSharry, a fashion journalist from the Daily Express, saw the images and asked to meet the young girl.

McSharry arranged to have more photos taken. A few weeks later, the publication featured an article and images of Hornby, declaring her "The Face of '66". In it, the copy read: "The Cockney kid with a face to launch a thousand shapes... and she's only 16".

Hornby's career quickly took off. De Villeneuve credits himself for Twiggy's discovery and her modelling success, and his version of events is often quoted in other biographies. In her 1998 book Twiggy In Black and White, she says that she met Justin through his brother, when she worked as a Saturday girl at a hairdressers in London. This is where she began to see the models in the magazines, but never thought she could do something like that. Jean Shrimpton was her idol, so she grew her hair long to look like her, before having to have it cut off for her headshots by Barry Lategan. Ten years her senior, De Villeneuve managed her lucrative career for seven years, overseeing her finances and enterprises during her heyday as a model.

Twiggy was soon seen in all the leading fashion magazines, commanding fees of £80 an hour, bringing out her own line of clothes called "Twiggy Dresses" in 1967, and taking the fashion world by storm. "I hated what I looked like," she said once, "so I thought everyone had gone stark raving mad." Twiggy's look centred on three qualities: her stick-thin figure, a boyishly short haircut and strikingly dark eyelashes. Her signature look was achieved in part by applying three layers of false eyelashes.

One month after the Daily Express article, Twiggy posed for her first shoot for Vogue. A year later, she had appeared in 13 separate fashion shoots in international Vogue editions.

1967–1970
Twiggy arrived in New York in March 1967 at Kennedy Airport, an event covered by the press. The New Yorker, Life and Newsweek reported on the Twiggy "phenomenon" in 1967, with the New Yorker devoting nearly 100 pages to the subject." That year she became an international sensation, modelling in France, Japan and America, and landing the cover of Paris Vogue in May, the cover of US Vogue three times, in April, July and November, and the cover of British Vogue in October. In 1967, an editorial on page 63 of the edition of 15 March of Vogue described her as an "extravaganza that makes the look of the sixties" Twiggy was, according to feminist critic Linda Delibero, "the most visible commodity Britain produced that year, and [America] generously complied with the hype, scarfing up skinny little Twiggy pens, Twiggy lunch boxes, Twiggy lashes, an assortment of Twiggy-endorsed cosmetics".

The Metropolitan Museum of Art's 2009 catalogue for its exhibition The Model as Muse: Embodying Fashion stated:Twiggy's adolescent physique was the perfect frame for the androgynous styles that began to emerge in the 1960s. The trend was manifested in a number of templates: sweet A-line dresses with collars and neckties, suits and dresses that took their details from military uniforms, or, in the case of Yves Saint Laurent, an explicit transposition of the male tuxedo to women. Simultaneously, under the rubric of "unisex", designs that were minimalistic, including Nehru suits and space-agey jumpsuits, were proposed by designers such as Pierre Cardin and Andre Courreges, and, most famously in the United States, by Rudi Gernreich.

Twiggy has been photographed by such noted photographers as Cecil Beaton, Richard Avedon, Melvin Sokolsky, Ronald Traeger, Bert Stern, Norman Parkinson, Annie Leibovitz and Steven Meisel.

Reaction
Twiggy and the magazines featuring her image polarised critics from the start. Her boyishly thin image was, and still is, criticised for allegedly promoting an "unhealthy" body ideal for women. "Twiggy came along at a time when teen-age spending power was never greater," said Su Dalgleish, fashion correspondent for the Daily Mail. "With that underdeveloped, boyish figure, she is an idol to the 14- and 15-year-old kids. She makes virtue of all the terrible things of gawky, miserable adolescence." At the height of her fame, Mark Cohen, president of Leeds Women's shop, had an even harsher view: "Her legs remind me of two painted worms." Yet Twiggy had her supporters. Diana Vreeland of Vogue stated, "She's no flash in the pan. She is the mini-girl in the mini-era. She's delicious looking." In recent years, Twiggy has spoken out against the trend of waif-thin models, explaining that her own thin weight as a teenager was natural: "I was very skinny, but that was just my natural build. I always ate sensibly – being thin was in my genes."

On 10 December 1969, despite being 20 years old, Twiggy was selected as the subject for one of the first editions produced by Thames Television of the television series This Is Your Life.

Stage, film, television, and singing career

1970–1979

After four years of modelling, Twiggy retired in 1970, stating: "You can't be a clothes hanger for your entire life!" She broke off with Justin de Villeneuve, who had been overseeing her business affairs since 1966 and released him from his duties as her manager, claiming in later years that "her career had more to do with that famous picture of her with those funny painted eyelashes, which appeared in the Daily Express under the headline 'The Face of '66' " than with his promotional efforts.

She has stated several times that she is only really remembered for her modelling career although it was "only a short part of my life". She began to develop a film interest through her weekly visits to Ken Russell's house; they would watch old films together, which featured Greta Garbo, Clark Gable, and other Hollywood actors and actresses. This began to give Twiggy a new outlook on the way she dressed and the way she wore her hair; she began wearing a beret, longer skirts, and flowers as the hippie look was beginning to take over London. Ken and Twiggy worked on a film together, called The Boy Friend (1971), after watching a performance of the original musical, staged by Ken's mother's amateur dramatics group.

Twiggy then embarked on an award-winning acting and singing career, starring in a variety of roles on stage and screen, and recording albums. In 1971, she made her film debut as an extra, dressed as a male courtier, in Ken Russell's The Devils. The same year, she performed her first leading role as Polly Browne, in Russell's adaptation of Sandy Wilson's pastiche of 1920s hit musicals, The Boy Friend (1971). This marked her initial collaboration with Tommy Tune, and won her two Golden Globe Awards in 1972 (New Star of the Year – Actress and Best Actress in a Musical or Comedy). Also in 1971, Twiggy released the single "Zoo de Zoo Zong", written by Roger Cook and Roger Greenaway, and credited to Twiggy and Friends. In 1974, she made her West End stage debut in Cinderella; made a second feature, the thriller W (co-starring with her future husband Michael Witney); and hosted her own British television series, Twiggs (later renamed Twiggy).

In 1973, she appeared with David Bowie on the cover of his seventh album, Pin Ups. which entered the UK chart on 3 November 1973 and stayed there for 21 weeks, peaking at No. 1. She was also name-checked ("She'd sigh like Twig the wonder kid") in Bowie's song Drive-In Saturday for his Aladdin Sane album.

In October 1975, she sang at the live performance of Roger Glover's The Butterfly Ball and the Grasshopper's Feast album at the Royal Albert Hall in London. The concert was filmed and produced by Tony Klinger and released to cinemas in 1976. In November 1976, she made an appearance on The Muppet Show, in which she sang the Beatles song, "In My Life". In 1976, she signed to Mercury Records and released the albums Twiggy and Please Get My Name Right, that contained both pop and country tunes. Twiggy sold very well, peaking on the UK charts at No. 33, and gave Twiggy a silver disc for good sales. The album contains Twiggy's top-20 hit single, "Here I Go Again". "Please Get My Name Right" made it to No. 35 in 1977. The single, "A Woman in Love", failed to chart for Twiggy in 1977 but was a hit for the Three Degrees in 1979. Twiggy also sang some of the songs in the first volume of Captain Beaky and His Band in 1977.

In 1978, the television distribution arm of American International Pictures, in an effort to gain additional syndication value in the US to the LWT rock music series Supersonic, repackaged the musical performances with Twiggy replacing Mike Mansfield's introductions. The new series, titled Twiggy's Jukebox, ran in most of the major television markets in the US during the 1978–79 TV season. Coincidentally, Twiggy had performed "Here I Go Again" and "Vanilla Olay" on Supersonic in September 1976, and these performances were included in the refurbished programme. After the initial season, Twiggy left the series, and American International Television continued Jukebox with Britt Ekland as host, using standard music videos rather than clips from Supersonic. Twiggy appeared in "There Goes the Bride" with Tom Smothers in 1979.

1980–1999
In 1980, Twiggy made a cameo appearance in The Blues Brothers. She starred as Eliza Doolittle in 1981, opposite Robert Powell, in the Yorkshire TV production of Pygmalion. In 1983, she made her Broadway debut in the musical, My One and Only, starring and co-staged by Tommy Tune, for which she earned a Tony nomination. She played opposite Robin Williams in the 1986 comedy Club Paradise. In 1987, she played a vaudeville performer in the British television special The Little Match Girl, and in 1988, she appeared in a supporting role in Madame Sousatzka opposite her second husband Leigh Lawson. In 1989, she was cast as Hannah Chaplin, mother to Charles, in the British television movie Young Charlie Chaplin, aired in the United States on PBS' WonderWorks.

In 1991, she co-starred in her first American network dramatic television series, the short-lived CBS sitcom Princesses. Of eight episodes completed, only five aired. (Her Princesses co-star, Fran Drescher, later spent some time with Twiggy and her family in England while developing Drescher's hit series The Nanny, and modelled the character Maxwell Sheffield on Twiggy's husband Leigh Lawson.)

In 1993, Twiggy appeared alongside Mark Hamill in the short segment "Eye" from the made-for-cable horror anthology, Body Bags.  In 1994, Twiggy guest starred in the first ever Heartbeat Christmas special (in series 4), playing Lady Janet Whitley. 

In 1997, Twiggy acted in the Chichester Festival Theatre revival of Noël Coward's Blithe Spirit. A year later, she played Gertrude Lawrence in the biographical stage revue Noel and Gertie at Bay Street Theatre in Sag Harbor, Long Island. In 1999, she returned to the New York stage in an off-Broadway production If Love Were All, a revised version of Noel and Gertie, written and directed by Leigh Lawson; what set this edition apart were its tap numbers in period style. She starred as Gertrude Lawrence opposite Harry Groener's Noël Coward.

2000–2009
In 2001, Twiggy co-hosted the British magazine programme This Morning. In 2003, she released another album, Midnight Blue. Seventeen of the CD's 20 tracks had previously unreleased material from 1982 to 1990, including a duet with Leo Sayer, "Save the Last Dance for Me", and a cover of the Rolling Stones' "Ruby Tuesday". Two of the tracks ("Feel Emotion" and "Diamond") had been issued as singles in the mid-1980s. In 2005, she joined the cast of the television show America's Next Top Model for Cycles 5–9 as one of four judges, and a year later, she appeared on the cover of the "Icons" issue of Swindle magazine. She also returned to modelling, fronting a major television, press, and billboard campaign for Marks & Spencer, the British department-store chain. Her involvement in the advertising campaign has been credited for reviving Marks and Spencer's fortunes.

In 2006, she portrayed herself as a 19-year-old in the radio play Elevenses with Twiggy, for BBC Radio 4's The Afternoon Play series. She did not return to America's Next Top Model in its tenth season due to scheduling conflicts. Her replacement was model Paulina Porizkova. Also in 2007, Sepia Records released a previously shelved album that Twiggy recorded in 1979, produced by Donna Summer and Juergen Koppers. Heaven in My Eyes ["Discotheque"] contains the eight original tracks due to be released, plus four remixes by The OUTpsiDER. The album was also made available on iTunes. In 2008, she supported the "Fashion Targets Breast Cancer" campaign in support of Breakthrough Breast Cancer, alongside fellow celebrities –comedian Alan Carr, singer Natalie Imbruglia, actress Anna Friel, and DJ & presenter Edith Bowman.

In the summer of 2009, the beauty products company Olay debuted its "Definity Eye Cream" campaign depicting Twiggy. Accusations of airbrushing created a stir with the media and public. A website campaign set up by Jo Swinson, the Scottish Liberal Democrat MP, attracted 700 individual complaints. Procter & Gamble admitted to minor retouching and replaced the image. The Advertising Standards Authority (ASA) announced that the ad gave a "misleading" impression, but that no further action was required because the image had already been withdrawn. Its announcement said:

Later career

2010–present
Twiggy remains in the forefront of fashion for women of her age. She was one of the few famous celebrities to survive being cut from the Marks & Spencer fashion team in 2009–2010, when Dannii Minogue joined her for the spring/summer women's wear campaign.

In 2010, she started a Home Shopping Network fashion line called the "Twiggy London" collection.

On 21 November 2011, she released an album, Romantically Yours, through EMI. A collection of pop and easy listening standards spanning several generations, the album features versions of such compositions as "Bewitched, Bothered and Bewildered", "Blue Moon", "My Funny Valentine", "Someone to Watch over Me" and "They Can't Take That Away from Me", and London anthem "Waterloo Sunset". The album also includes a guest vocal appearance by Twiggy's daughter, Carly Lawson, on Neil Young's "Only Love Can Break Your Heart", a guitar solo by Bryan Adams, and a version of Richard Marx's "Right Here Waiting" featuring duet vocals with the American songwriter himself. In 2016, archive images of Twiggy, alongside images of Shrimpton and Jane Birkin were used for Tod's Fall/Winter campaign.

Honours
She was appointed a Dame Commander of the Order of the British Empire (DBE) in the 2019 New Year Honours for services to fashion, to the arts and to charity. She was gazetted under her married name, Lesley Lawson.

Personal life
Twiggy married American actor Michael Witney in 1977. Their daughter, Carly, was born in 1978. They remained married until his death in 1983 from a heart attack.

She met Leigh Lawson in 1984. In 1988, they worked on the film Madame Sousatzka and married that year in Sag Harbor, New York (on Long Island). The couple reside in London and own a home in Southwold, Suffolk.

On Twiggy's official website, she states she is a supporter of breast cancer research, animal welfare, and anti-fur campaigns. She was one of the celebrities, including Tom Hiddleston, Jo Brand, E. L. James, Benedict Cumberbatch, and Rachel Riley, to design and sign her own card for the UK-based charity Thomas Coram Foundation for Children. The campaign was launched by crafting company Stampin' Up! UK, and the cards were auctioned off on eBay during May 2014.

Filmography

Film

Television

 Twiggs (1974)
 Twiggy  (1975)
 The Muppet Show (1976) (episode 21)
 Victorian Scandals (1976)
 Bing Crosby's Merrie Olde Christmas (1977)
 The Hanna-Barbera Happy Hour (1978)
 The Donna Summer Special (1980)
 A Gift of Music (1981)
 Pygmalion, Eliza Doolittle. Celebrity Playhouse, Yorkshire Television (December 1981)
 Young Charlie Chaplin (1989)
 Princesses (1991)
 Tales from the Crypt (1992) (1 episode)
 The Nanny (1994) (1 episode)
 Heartbeat (1994) (1 episode)
 Absolutely Fabulous (2000–2001)
 This Morning (presenter) (2001)
 Take Time With Twiggy (host) (2001)
 America's Next Top Model (judge, cycles 5–9) (2005–2007)
 ShakespeaRe-Told: The Taming of the Shrew (2005)
 Friday Night with Jonathan Ross (guest) (2008)
 Twiggy's Frock Exchange (2008)
 Alan Titchmarsh's Walks of Fame (2010) 
 Who Do You Think You Are? (episode 100) (2014)
 The People's History Of Pop (host, 1 episode) (2016)
 RuPaul's Drag Race UK (judge, 1 episode) (2019)

Stage

 Cinderella, Casino Theatre, London, (1974)
 The Butterfly Ball and the Grasshopper's Feast, the Royal Albert Hall, London (1975)
 Captain Beaky and His Musical Christmas (pantomime), Apollo Victoria Theatre, London (1981)
 My One and Only, St. James Theatre, New York (1983–1984)
 Blithe Spirit, Chichester Festival Theatre, (1997)
 Noel and Gertie, Bay Street Theatre, Long Island, New York, (1998)
 If Love Were All, Lucille Lortel Theatre, New York City (1999)
 Blithe Spirit, Bay Street Theatre, Long Island, New York (2002)
 Mrs. Warren's Profession, on tour, England (2003)

Discography
Albums
1971 The Boyfriend (Original Soundtrack) (MGM Records)
1972 Twiggy and the Girlfriends (Ember)
1976 Twiggy (Mercury) (UK #33)
1977 Please Get My Name Right (Mercury) (UK #35)
1977 Captain Beaky and His Band
1983 My One and Only (with Tommy Tune) (Atlantic)
2003 Midnight Blue (Eureka) (unreleased material from the 1980s)
2007 Heaven In My Eyes - Discotheque (Eureka) (unreleased material from the 1970s)
2009 Gotta Sing Gotta Dance (Stage Door)
2011 Romantically Yours (EMI)

Singles
1966 "Some Do Some Don't (Some Will Some Won't)" (with Anne) (Columbia)
1967 "Beautiful Dreams" (Ember)
1967 "When I Think of You" (Ember)
1971 "Zoo De Zoo Zong" (with Friends) (Bell)
1972 "A Room in Bloomsbury" (with Christopher Gable) (Columbia)
1976 "Here I Go Again" (Mercury) (UK #17)
1976 "Vanilla Olay" (Mercury)
1977 "Rings" ((UK #35) from her album Please Get My Name Right)
1977 "Please Get My Name Right" (Mercury)
1977 "I Hope We Get to Love in Time" (Mercury)
1977 "A Woman in Love" (Mercury)
1977 "Tomorrow is Another Day" (Mercury)
1978 "Falling Angel" (Mercury)
1985 "Feel Emotion" (Arista) (UK #81)
1986 "Diamond" (Arista)
1989 "Winter Wonderland" (Object)

Books and exhibits

 Twiggy, Twiggy: An Autobiography (1975), 
 Twiggy, Twiggy's Guide to Looking Good (1986), 
 Twiggy, Twiggy in Black and White (1997), 
 Emma Midgley, "London Swings Again With Ossie Clark Show At The V&A" (22 July 2003), Culture24
 Twiggy, Twiggy: Please Get My Name Right (2004), Word Power Books, 
 Iain R Webb, Bill Gibb: Fashion and Fantasy (2008), foreword by Twiggy, 
 Twiggy, A Guide to Looking and Feeling Fabulous Over Forty (2008), 
 The Model as Muse: Embodying Fashion, Metropolitan Museum of Art, May–August 2009
 Twiggy: A Life in Photographs, Terence Pepper, Robin Muir, and Melvin Sokolsky (2009), 
 Twiggy: A Life in Photographs, National Portrait Gallery (2009–2010)

References

Further reading
 
 Gross, Michael. Model: The ugly business of beautiful women (Harper Collins, 2011).
 Sandbrook, Dominic. White Heat: A history of Britain in the swinging sixties (Abacus, 2015) pp 283–308.

External links

 1967 Newsweek cover and Twiggy article
 Images of Twiggy, National Portrait Gallery
 "My Best Shot: Twiggy" by Barry Lategan
 
 
 Twiggy at Internet Off-Broadway Database
 
 Twiggy interview in Swindle magazine
 "Twiggy: You Ask the Questions", The Independent
 "Twiggy: Fashion Icon " – slideshow by Life magazine
 Twiggy interview on BBC Radio 4 Desert Island Discs, 13 January 1989

1949 births
Living people
Best Musical or Comedy Actress Golden Globe (film) winners
Dames Commander of the Order of the British Empire
English female models
English women singers
English film actresses
English stage actresses
New Star of the Year (Actress) Golden Globe winners
Actresses from London
People from Neasden
Actresses awarded damehoods
Singers awarded knighthoods
Women autobiographers